Pewe is a small village in Ratnagiri district, Maharashtra state in Western India. The 2011 Census of India recorded a total of 1,143 residents in the village.

Village name: Pewe;
Taluka name: Mandangad;
District: Ratnagiri;
State: Maharashtra;
Total population: 1143;
House Holds: 310

References

Villages in Ratnagiri district